Divo or DIVO may refer to:

Divo, Ivory Coast, a town in the Ivory Coast
Divo Department, a department of the Ivory Coast
Il Divo, an operatic pop quartet
Il Divo (film), an Italian film directed by Paolo Sorrentino
Divo (record label), an Indian-based record label
Albert Divo (1895-1966), an early twentieth century Grand Prix motor racing driver
Bugatti Divo, a track-focused sports car manufactured by Bugatti

See also 
Devo, an American New Wave group